The Partnach Gorge is a deep gorge that has been incised by a mountain stream, the Partnach, in the Reintal valley near the south German town of Garmisch-Partenkirchen. It was designated a natural monument in 1912.

Geology and origin 

In the Triassic, about 240 million years ago, on the bed of a shallow sea, dark grey, relatively hard layers of Alpine muschelkalk, so-called Wurstelkalk, were laid down in the area of the present day Partnach Gorge. On the bead-like strata of this rock the traces of the burrowing and feeding of marine animals can still be seen. Importantly, about 5 million years later, softer marls were deposited in the same marine basin, which today are known as Partnach Strata (Partnach-schichten).

In the course of the subsequent Alpine mountain folding the so-called Warnberg Saddle (Warnberger Sattel) was formed from these rock strata. The erosion force of the Partnach stream, fed from the Schneeferner glacier on the Zugspitzplatt plateau, was great enough to carry away quickly the softer layers, to keep pace with the continued uplifting of the terrain and thus to cut into the hard Alpine muschelkalk as well.
Today the river forms the typically narrow valley shape of a gorge (Klamm) in the area of the muschelkalk rocks, while the areas of softer Partnach strata to the north and south have a wider valley cross-section.

Economic significance 
The gorge was already being used by local peoples in the 18th century who, at risk of their lives, transported firewood from the Reintal valley on timber rafts to Partenkirchen.
From the 18th century to the 1960s the river and the gorge were used as a rafting stream. In spring the logs, marked with an owner's symbol (Hausmach), were thrown into the stream and carried by meltwaters down the valley. The freeing of jammed logs required much daring and men were frequently lost in carrying out this dangerous task. Boards on a wayside cross between the Olympic Stadium and the entrance to the gorge bear witness to these accidents.

Since 1912 the gorge has been developed for tourists and can be visited all year round. An entry fee is charged in summer between 8 am and 6 pm and in winter between 9 am and 5 pm. Outside these times the gorge may be visited at individual risk. During snowmelt in spring the gorge may also be closed for a short period.

Rockfall 
On 1 June 1991 about 5,000 m³ of rock broke away from a rock face at the southern end of the gorge and blocked the old path as well as the watercourse. Fortunately this unexpected rockfall did not claim any lives. A small, natural dammed lake was formed and the Partnach channelled its way through the giant boulders. The gallery is lit by windows, from which one can see this natural event in complete safety.

Nearby gorges 
In Garmisch-Partenkirchen near Mittenwald there is a smaller gorge, the Leutasch Gorge (Leutaschklamm) on the border with Austria, that has an impressive trail, opened on 24 May 2006. There is also the Höllental Gorge (Höllentalklamm) near Grainau-Hammersbach.

In popular culture 
The Partnach Gorge served as a film location for the 1979 film Nosferatu the Vampyre.  In an early montage, the protagonist travels through the wilderness to Count Dracula's castle.  Although the film's dialogue refers to the route as the Borgo Pass in the Carpathian Mountains (in accordance with Bram Stoker's novel, Dracula), the footage of the narrow passages and rushing water clearly identifies the location as the Partnach.

External links 

 Information on the gorge at the Bavarian State Office for the Environment 
 Much interesting information on the formation and use of the gorge, and a virtual tour 
 Many photographs of the Partnach Gorge in summer and winter and other information

References 

Canyons and gorges of Germany
Slot canyons
Landforms of Bavaria
Garmisch-Partenkirchen (district)
Protected areas of Bavaria